Carol Lynn Folt (born 1951) is an American academic administrator who is the 12th president of the University of Southern California. She is also the first female president in the university’s 142-year history. She assumed her duties on July 1, 2019. She was previously the 11th chancellor, and the 29th chief executive, of the University of North Carolina at Chapel Hill, the first woman to hold the post. She was previously provost (chief academic officer) and interim president of Dartmouth College. On January 14, 2019, she announced her resignation as UNC chancellor.

Early life and career 
A native of Akron, Ohio, Folt is the granddaughter of immigrants from Albania. She graduated from the University of California, Santa Barbara in 1976 with a bachelor's degree in aquatic biology. She earned a master's degree in biology from the same institution in 1978, and a doctorate in ecology from the University of California, Davis in 1982. After conducting postdoctoral studies at the Kellogg Biological Station at Michigan State University, she joined Dartmouth in 1983 as a research instructor in biological sciences, and has conducted extensive research in metal toxicity. Since 2007, she has held an endowed professorship in biological sciences.

Folt joined Dartmouth's administration in 2001, when she was named dean of graduate studies and associate dean of the faculty. She became dean of the faculty in 2004.  She was tapped as acting provost in 2009, and appointed provost in 2010. When Dartmouth president Jim Yong Kim was named as president of the World Bank in July 2012, Folt was named acting president.

Chancellor of UNC 
Folt was chosen as UNC's chancellor by the board of governors of the UNC System to succeed Holden Thorp, who resigned the position in June 2013 amid allegations of widespread academic fraud. She described her selection as "the honor of a lifetime" and vowed to ensure that UNC's students "don't simply learn what we know but they learn how to create what will be."

Academic-athletic scandal 

Under Chancellor Folt's direction, UNC spent approximately 18 million dollars defending itself from NCAA sanctions for prolonged and widespread fraud within academic and athletics departments, the details of which were outlined in Wainstein Report. The Report summarizes the findings of an independent investigation conducted by former federal prosecutor Kenneth Wainstein. It describes abuses spanning over 18 years (during the tenures of Chancellor Michael Hooker, Chancellor James Moeser, Chancellor Holden Thorp), including "no-show" classes that had little to no faculty oversight. Approximately half of the enrollees in these "no-show" classes were athletes.

When the Wainstein Report was released in 2014, Folt acknowledged "It is just very clear that it was an academic issue with the way the courses were administered, and it is clearly an athletics issue." The Southern Association of Colleges and Schools, the regional accreditation body for UNC, took the nearly unprecedented step of placing UNC on a year of probation, wherein any further missteps would lead to the university's accreditation being removed, effectively dooming the entire university. Folt brought forth reforms on several levels, and the probation was consequently lifted with no further sanctions after a year.

While not nearly as important for the well-being of the university as a whole, UNC also faced the possibility of serious sanctions from the NCAA. Under Folt's leadership, the university later went on to deny that the academic fraud was specifically benefiting athletics in its defense to the NCAA, broadly attempting to insulate the UNC administration from the findings of the Wainstein Report and the allegations of UNC whistleblower Mary Willingham. One of the key assertions the university made in its own defense was that the NCAA did not have jurisdiction, since the university created and offered "no-show" courses not as part of a systemic effort to benefit athletes, but the student body in general. While citing the failure of multiple UNC administrators to cooperate with the investigation, the NCAA's Committee on Infractions did not hold UNC responsible, finding that "no-show" classes were not specifically designed to benefit athletes. This finding led both fans and media across the country to question "the integrity of the NCAA, suggesting that UNC's case would open the doors for other universities to set up similar no-show classes so long as non-athletes could enroll."

Silent Sam monument controversy 
During her term as chancellor, Folt had to deal with the controversy over the monument Silent Sam, which at times included demonstrators outside her office. Folt resigned as chancellor on January 14, 2019, effective end of the spring semester, stating: "There has been too much recent disruption due to the monument controversy". In the same letter, she ordered the remaining plinth (pedestal) to be removed, as a threat to campus safety. Later, the University of North Carolina system board of governors made her resignation effective January 31.

President of USC 
Folt became president of USC on July 1, 2019. She was appointed by USC’s board of trustees and was the unanimous choice by the search committee to usher in a new era for the university following a series of high-profile scandals.

Affordability Initiative
In February 2020, Folt announced a plan to eliminate tuition for families earning $80,000 or less annually. Additionally, the university said it would no longer consider home equity in financial aid calculation.

Tyndall Settlement
As part of Folt's reform efforts, in March 2021 the university agreed to pay more than $1.1 billion to former patients of campus gynecologist George Tyndall who was accused of preying on a generation of USC women.

Anti-Semitic Tweet controversy
In the summer of 2021, USC became embroiled in a free speech quagmire over tweets posted by Yasmeen Mashayekh, a 21-year-old, Palestinian civil engineering student whose statements include, "I Want to Kill Every Motherfucking Zionist". On December 1, 2021, 60 faculty members sent the latest in a series of letters to USC President Carol Folt, Provost Charles Zukoski, and board of trustees' chair Rick Caruso, urging the school publicly rebuke Mashayekh and take action "to distance USC from her hateful statements," the Los Angeles Times reports.

"The silence of our leadership on this matter is alienating, hurtful, and depressing," the letter read. "It amounts to tacit acceptance of a toxic atmosphere of hatred and hostility."

Honoring Nisei Students

In April 2022, President Folt awarded honorary degrees posthumously to 33 Japanese American students who saw their USC educations derailed during the war when USC, unlike other universities, refused to let its Nisei students return to study and denied them their rightful transcripts. Folt also dedicated a rock garden on the USC campus to honor the university’s Nisei students.

Renaming the international center for public affairs to honor a Native American war hero
In June 2020, Folt announced the university was stripping the name of former USC President Rufus Von KleinSmid - an active supporter of the eugenics movement - from its international center for public affairs. In April 2022, Folt made the decision to rename the building in honor of Joseph Medicine Crow, a Native American alumnus and World War II war hero.

Personal life 
Folt is married to fellow Dartmouth professor David Peart; they have two children.

References

Further reading

External links 
 USC biography

1951 births
21st-century American biologists
American people of Albanian descent
Leaders of the University of North Carolina at Chapel Hill
Living people
People from Akron, Ohio
People from Chapel Hill, North Carolina
Presidents of the University of Southern California
University of California, Santa Barbara alumni
University of California, Davis alumni
Dartmouth College faculty